Castlesteads is an Iron Age promontory fort, situated on the east bank of the River Irwell on a natural promontory in Bury, Greater Manchester. It is listed as a Scheduled Ancient Monument. Excavated pottery indicates the site was occupied between 200BC and 250AD.

See also
Scheduled Monuments in Greater Manchester

References

Buildings and structures in the Metropolitan Borough of Bury
Scheduled monuments in Greater Manchester